Bajram Nebihi (born 5 August 1988) is a Kosovan professional footballer who plays as a forward or attacking midfielder.

Career
Nebihi began his career with TSV Ingolstadt Nord and was the scouted by city rival Grün-Weiß Ingolstadt. After two years with Grün-Weiß, he signed for FC Ingolstadt 04 in July 2002. In 2005, at the age of almost 17, he left Ingolstadt, where he had grown up and joined Jahn Regensburg. But there he stayed only a year and left then for TSV Aindling.

Nebihi left after one year where he played 29 games and scored four goals for TSV Aindling to sign for FC Augsburg. After one year with the reserve team of FC Augsburg, he signed in summer 2008 with Zob Ahan in the Iran Pro League. On 21 July 2009, SV Wacker Burghausen signed the 20-year-old midfield player for one year. In 2010, he left Germany again for Süper Lig side Bursaspor. But due to arguments about his salary the contract was annulled.

On 25 August 2016, Nebihi signed with Inter Turku until the end of the 2016 season.

Nebihi joined SV Curslack-Neuengamme of the fifth-tier Oberliga Hamburg in September 2021.

References

External links
 
 
 

1988 births
Living people
Sportspeople from Mitrovica, Kosovo
Sportspeople from Ingolstadt
Footballers from Bavaria
Association football forwards
German footballers
Kosovan footballers
FC Augsburg II players
Zob Ahan Esfahan F.C. players
SV Wacker Burghausen players
Bursaspor footballers
1. FC Union Berlin players
Stuttgarter Kickers players
FC Inter Turku players
Bajram Nebihi
Bajram Nebihi
Bajram Nebihi
Bajram Nebihi
KF Ballkani players
Flamurtari Vlorë players
2. Bundesliga players
3. Liga players
Bajram Nebihi
Veikkausliiga players
Kategoria Superiore players
Football Superleague of Kosovo players
Kosovan expatriate footballers
Expatriate footballers in Iran
Kosovan expatriate sportspeople in Iran
Expatriate footballers in Turkey
Kosovan expatriate sportspeople in Turkey
Expatriate footballers in Finland
Kosovan expatriate sportspeople in Finland
Expatriate footballers in Thailand